Pacific Street is the debut album by British band The Pale Fountains. The CD version of the LP contains all 11 of the songs that first appeared on it, plus 4 bonus tracks: "Thank You", "Meadow of Love", "Palm of My Hand" and "Love's a Beautiful Place".

Pacific Street contained an acoustic sound tendentially, engaged in trumpet and flute, with influences from Burt Bacharach, Love, Bossa nova and new and extremely melodious pop songs.

The band would record one more album before splitting and Head would re-emerge a few years later fronting Shack.

Track listing

Personnel

The Pale Fountains
Mick Head – vocals, guitar
John Head – lead guitar
Chris McCaffrey – bass, percussion
Thomas Whelan – drums, percussion
Andy Diagram – trumpet, keyboards

Additional musicians
Marc L'Etarjet – cello
Trixi – keyboards
Julie Andrews – flute

References

1984 debut albums
Virgin Records albums
New wave albums by English artists